Orange Line 5 of the Mumbai Metro, or the Thane-Bhiwandi-Kalyan Line, is part of the metro system for the city of Mumbai, India. This line construction is divided into two phases. Phase 1 will cover the metro route from Thane to Bhiwandi, and Phase 2 will cover the other stretch from Bhiwandi to Kalyan. In a recent update in March 2022, MMRDA has come up with a new plan to build a  underground track to prevent the demolition of thousands of structures. The new plan for phase 2 will also increase the project's overall cost by ₹1,727 Cr.

The -long Thane-Bhiwandi-Kalyan Metro-V corridor will have 17 stations and will cost Rs. 8,416 crores. It will be totally an elevated corridor for Phase 1 however, Phase 2 is still under planning phase. It will connect Thane to Bhiwandi and Kalyan in the eastern suburbs. The stations include Kapurbawdi in Thane (West), Balkum Naka, Kasheli, Kalher, Purna, Anjur Phata, Dhamankar Naka, Bhiwandi, Gopal Nagar, Temghar, Rajnouli Village, Govegaon MIDC, Kongaon, Durgadi Fort, Sahajanand Chowk, Kalyan Railway Station. MMRDA approved the line on 19 October 2016 and Maharashtra Cabinet on 24 October 2017.

After the approval of Metro line 5, CM Devendra Fadnavis had a meeting with MP Shrikant Shinde, who suggested to extend the Thane-Bhiwandi-Kalyan metro corridor to far-eastern suburbs like Dombivli, Badlapur, and Ambernath, and link it with the Navi Mumbai lines. The population in Dombivli, Badlapur, Ambernath, and Diva is growing rapidly because many middle-class populations started moving here in search of affordable budget homes. CM Devendra Fadnavis directed MMRDA to prepare a detailed project report (DPR) for Taloja – Dombivli – Kalyan metro corridor. On 21 November 2018, CM Devendra Fadnavis approved the detailed project report (DPR) for Mumbai Metro Line 12 (Kalyan-Dombivli-Taloja), an extension of the Metro line 5 metro corridor.

The MMRDA began carrying out survey work for the line by December 2017. Survey work was interrupted due to protests by some shopkeepers and residents of Bhiwandi.

The plan is revised for phase 2 construction

Construction

Current status

Phase 1 – Thane to Bhiwandi

Phase 2 – Bhiwandi to Kalyan
Delhi Metro Rail Corporation is appointed to finalize the alignment and to prepare the revise DPR

Stations
There will be 17 stations on Line 5.

References

Mumbai Metro lines